The 2023 LIU Sharks men's volleyball team, the second LIU men's volleyball team, represents Long Island University Brooklyn in the 2023 NCAA Division I & II men's volleyball season. The Sharks, led by first year head coach Kai Dugquem, play their home games at Steinberg Wellness Center. The Sharks compete as a member of the newly created Northeast Conference men's volleyball conference. After winning most of their games at the end of last season, the Sharks were picked to finish third in the NEC.

Season highlights
Will be filled in as the season progresses.

Roster

Schedule
TV/Internet Streaming information:
All home games will be streamed on NEC Front Row. Most road games will be streamed by the schools streaming service.

 *-Indicates conference match.
 Times listed are Eastern Time Zone.

Announcers for televised games
Belmont Abbey: Brian Rushing
Queens: Mike Glennon & Paul McDonald
Limestone: Scott Berry & Mike Harmon
George Mason: Josh Yourish
Loyola Chicago: 
Lindenwood: Michael Wagenknecht & Sara Wagenknecht
McKendree: 
Fairleigh Dickinson: 
St. Francis: 
Hawai'i: 
Hawai'i: 
American International: 
Harvard: 
D'Youville: 
Daemen: 
St. Francis Brooklyn: 
St. Francis Brooklyn: 
American International: 
Merrimack: 
Sacred Heart: 
Daemen: 
D'Youville : 
Fairleigh Dickinson: 
St. Francis: 
Merrimack: 
Sacred Heart:

References

2023 in sports in New York (state)
LIU
LIU